In enzymology, a pyridoxine 5-dehydrogenase is an enzyme that catalyzes the chemical reaction

pyridoxine + acceptor  isopyridoxal + reduced acceptor

Thus, the two substrates of this enzyme are pyridoxine and acceptor, whereas its two products are isopyridoxal and reduced acceptor.

This enzyme belongs to the family of oxidoreductases, specifically those acting on the CH-OH group of donor with other acceptors.  The systematic name of this enzyme class is pyridoxine:acceptor 5-oxidoreductase. Other names in common use include pyridoxal-5-dehydrogenase, pyridoxol 5-dehydrogenase, pyridoxin 5-dehydrogenase, pyridoxine dehydrogenase, pyridoxine 5'-dehydrogenase, and pyridoxine:(acceptor) 5-oxidoreductase.  This enzyme participates in vitamin B6 metabolism.  It has 2 cofactors: FAD,  and PQQ.

References

 

EC 1.1.99
Flavoproteins
Pyrroloquinoline quinone enzymes
Enzymes of unknown structure